Konstantinos Lima (born 13 November 1993) is a Greek professional footballer who plays as a defender for Panionios.

Career

Club career

Lima started his career with Greek second division side Kalloni, where he made 4 appearances and scored 0 goals. On 30 June 2012, he debuted for Kalloni during a 4-0 win over Panachaiki. Before the second half of 2013–14, Lima signed for Pannaxiakos in the Greek third division.

International career

He is eligible to represent Cape Verde internationally through his father, former footballer Noni Lima.

References

External links
 Konstantinos Lima at playmakerstats.com

Greek footballers
Living people
Association football defenders
1993 births
Greek people of Cape Verdean descent
AEL Kalloni F.C. players
Super League Greece players
Gamma Ethniki players
Niki Volos F.C. players
Aiolikos F.C. players
Episkopi F.C. players
People from Lemnos